Mole Lake may refer to:

Mole Lake, Wisconsin, an unincorporated community
Mole Lake Band of Lake Superior Chippewa, an alternative name for the Sokaogon Chippewa Community
Mole Lake Indian Reservation
Battle of Mole Lake (1806), between Sioux and Chippewa warriors